Trappes is a station on the Paris–Brest railway. It is served by suburban Transilien Line N and U services. It is within Trappes.

See also 

 List of stations of the Paris RER

References

External links
 

Réseau Express Régional stations
Railway stations in Yvelines
Railway stations in France opened in 1849